Schönfließ is a railway station in the Oberhavel district of Brandenburg. It is served by the S-Bahn line . It lies on the Berlin outer ring and was formerly served by regional trains.

References

Berlin S-Bahn stations
Railway stations in Brandenburg
Buildings and structures in Oberhavel
Railway stations in Germany opened in 1953